The 4 arrondissements of the Meurthe-et-Moselle department are:
 Arrondissement of Briey (subprefecture: Val de Briey), with 128 communes.  The population of the arrondissement was 166,309 in 2016.  
 Arrondissement of Lunéville (subprefecture: Lunéville), with 164 communes.  The population of the arrondissement was 78,662 in 2016.  
 Arrondissement of Nancy (prefecture of the Meurthe-et-Moselle department: Nancy), with 188 communes.  The population of the arrondissement was 419,699 in 2016.  
 Arrondissement of Toul (subprefecture: Toul), with 111 communes. The population of the arrondissement was 69,151 in 2016.

History

In 1800 the arrondissements of Nancy, Château-Salins, Lunéville, Sarrebourg and Toul were established as subdivisions of the department Meurthe, and Briey as part of the department Moselle. In 1871 the parts of the departments Meurthe and Moselle that had not been ceded to Germany were combined in the new department Meurthe-et-Moselle, with the arrondissements of Nancy, Briey, Lunéville and Toul. The arrondissement of Toul was disbanded in 1926, and restored in 1943.

References

Meurthe-et-Moselle